For the National Football League running back, see Derek Ross

Derrick Lewis Ross (born December 29, 1983) was an American football/arena football running back for the Jacksonville Sharks of the National Arena League (NAL). He played one season with the Kansas City Chiefs (2006). Ross played college football at Blinn College and Tarleton State University.

Early life
Ross attended Huntsville High School in Huntsville, Texas. Ross began his high school career as a defensive end before switching to running back.

College career
Ross started his college football career at Blinn College in Brenham, Texas. As a sophomore in 2003, Ross was named First-team All-Southwest Junior College Football Conference, as well the conference Offensive MVP. After graduating from Blinn, Ross transferred to Tarleton State University in Stephenville, Texas, where he had received a football scholarship. In his first game with the Texans, Ross ran for a then-school record 261 yards on just 20 carries.

Professional career

Kansas City Chiefs
Ross played for the Kansas City Chiefs as a backup fullback for the 2006 season. He played in seven games, gaining three yards.

Cologne Centurions
Ross spent a year in Cologne, Germany on the roster of the Cologne Centurions of NFL Europe, where he was awarded Co-Offensive MVP alongside J. T. O'Sullivan.

Montreal Alouettes And Winnipeg Blue Bombers
Ross spent two years in the CFL With the Winnipeg Blue Bombers and Montreal Alouettes as a backup halfback and special teamer.

San Angelo Stampede Express
Ross spent a year in the Indoor Football League for the San Angelo Stampede Express, where he was awarded Rookie of the Year

Dallas Vigilantes
Ross kicked off his AFL career with a one-year contract for the Dallas Vigilantes.

Philadelphia Soul
In 2012, Ross and quarterback Dan Raudabaugh were brought to the Soul, with Ross being signed to a three-year deal. Following the 2013 season, Ross was named 1st Team All-Arena for the third consecutive season. also in the same year Ross broke the AFL's leagues all-time rushing record,a record previously held by Bo Kelly, During the Soul's June 7, 2014, game, Ross passed Barry Wagner as the AFL's all-time leader in rushing touchdowns.

Los Angeles KISS
On February 20, 2015, Ross was traded to the Los Angeles KISS in exchange for Beau Bell.

Las Vegas Outlaws
On March 11, 2015, Ross was traded to the Las Vegas Outlaws, along with Lacoltan Bester, for Donovan Morgan.

Jacksonville Sharks
On March 15, 2015, Ross was traded to the Jacksonville Sharks in exchange for Undra Hendrix, Jomo Wilson and Nyere Aumaitre. Ross was assigned to the Sharks on October 22, 2015, on a 2-year contract.

References

External links
 Kansas City Chiefs

1983 births
Living people
People from Huntsville, Texas
Players of American football from Texas
American football running backs
Blinn Buccaneers football players
Tarleton State Texans football players
Kansas City Chiefs players
Cologne Centurions (NFL Europe) players
San Angelo Stampede Express players
Dallas Vigilantes players
Philadelphia Soul players
Los Angeles Kiss players
Las Vegas Outlaws (arena football) players
Jacksonville Sharks players